Raúl Fernández González (born 23 October 2000) is a Spanish Grand Prix motorcycle racer competing in the MotoGP World Championship with RNF MotoGP Team. His younger brother, Adrián, is also a motorcycle racer. They are not related to Moto2 rider Augusto Fernández. He was 2018 FIM CEV Moto3 Junior World Champion.

Career

Junior career
Fernández competed in the 2015 Red Bull MotoGP Rookies Cup, finishing 3rd in Brno, 2nd in Misano, and 2nd in Aragón in his rookie campaign, ending the season 7th in the overall standings, with 121 points. He competed again in 2016, this time finishing on the podium six times (twice 1st, three times 2nd, and once 3rd), winning two races in Assen (both from Pole Position), and finishing the season in 3rd overall. He was the 2018 FIM CEV Moto3 Junior World Champion.

Moto3 World Championship

MH6 Team (2016)
In the last race of the 2016 Moto3 World Championship, Fernández made his Grand Prix debut at Valencia, as the replacement for the injured María Herrera, scoring championship points with an 11th place.

Aspar Team (2017–2019)

Fernández would make three wild-card round entries for the Mahindra Aspar Team in 2017, finishing 25th in Jerez, retiring in Assen, and finishing 22nd in Germany.

He would once again make four wild-card round entries for the Aspar Team in 2018, this time riding KTM bikes used by the Aspar team. He improved his prior season's results, and earned himself a full time ride for next year with his 10th place in Barcelona, 9th place in Germany, 17th place in Aragón, and 13th place in Valencia.

In his first full year in Moto3, Fernández had a decent rookie season, finishing in the points ten times, finishing in the top-ten six times, with his season's highest being a 5th place finish in Germany. He ended the 2019 season 21st in the championship standings, with 60 points.

Red Bull KTM Ajo (2020)
Due to his good performances, Fernández was given a contract by the Red Bull KTM Ajo team for the 2020 season, which saw him steadily improve over the course of the year. He had six Pole Positions during the season (Czechia, Austria, Misano, Aragón, Valencia, and Portimao), two 3rd places in Aragón and Valencia, and won the European Grand Prix, and Portuguese Grand Prix. He ended the season 4th in the championship standings, with 159 points, just 15 points away from 1st.

Moto2 World Championship

Red Bull KTM Ajo (2021)

Being promoted to Moto2, but staying with the Red Bull KTM Ajo family, Fernández had the best rookie season ever in Moto2, beating several records of Marc Márquez. He won eight races (Portugal, France, Netherlands, Austria, Aragón, Rimini, USA, and Valencia), had seven Pole Positions, stood on the podium 12 times, finished outside of the top-seven just the three times he retired from a race (Germany, Great Britain, Misano), and finished second in the standings, just 4 points away from teammate Remy Gardner, who won the title.

MotoGP World Championship

Tech3 KTM Factory Racing (2022)
In August 2021, it was announced that both Fernández and Gardner would be promoted to MotoGP, riding for Red Bull KTM Tech3 in the 2022 season. Fernández becomes just the third rider to be promoted to MotoGP after one lone season in Moto2, following Maverick Viñales, and Joan Mir.

RNF MotoGP Team (from 2023)

Career statistics

FIM CEV Moto3 Junior World Championship

Races by year
(key) (Races in bold indicate pole position, races in italics indicate fastest lap)

Red Bull MotoGP Rookies Cup

Races by year
(key) (Races in bold indicate pole position, races in italics indicate fastest lap)

Grand Prix motorcycle racing

By season

By class

Races by year 
(key) (Races in bold indicate pole position, races in italics indicate fastest lap)

References

External links

2000 births
Living people
Spanish motorcycle racers
Moto3 World Championship riders
Sportspeople from Madrid
Moto2 World Championship riders
MotoGP World Championship riders
Tech3 MotoGP riders
21st-century Spanish people